Loxostege argyrostacta is a moth in the family Crambidae. It was described by George Hampson in 1910. It is found in the Democratic Republic of the Congo and Zambia.

References

Moths described in 1910
Pyraustinae